The following is a list of compilation albums of songs recorded by U.S. singer Jo Stafford that were released between 2000 and 2009. They include material from her solo career, and recordings she made with artists such as Gordon MacRae, as well as her foray into comedy with husband Paul Weston as New Jersey lounge act Jonathan and Darlene Edwards.

==Just Reminiscin==Just Reminiscin' is a 2000 compilation album of songs recorded by American singer Jo Stafford. The album was released on January 1, 2000, in the United Kingdom on the Dutton Laboratories/Vocalion label.

Jo & FriendsJo & Friends is a 2000 compilation album of songs recorded by American singer Jo Stafford and various other artists. The friends who accompany her on this album include Nelson Eddy, Liberace and Vic Damone. It was released by Sony Music on their Sony Music Special Products label on January 1, 2000. A second album, titled Jo Stafford and Friends featuring the same tracks was released on October 30, 2007, on the Collectables Records label.

In 2008 the album was released as part of a three CD set along with  Getting Sentimental over Tommy Dorsey  and Best of Jo Stafford.

The Columbia Hits CollectionThe Columbia Hits Collection is a 2001 compilation album of songs recorded by American singer Jo Stafford. It was released by Corinthian Records on January 1, 2001.

CandyCandy is a 2001 compilation album of songs recorded by American singer Jo Stafford. It was released by Proper Sales & Distribution on January 1, 2001.

Haunted HeartHaunted Heart is a 2001 compilation album of songs recorded by American singer Jo Stafford. It was released by the X5 Music Group on January 1, 2001.

{| class="wikitable collapsible collapsed" style="width:300px;"
|-
!Track listing
|-
|1 Almost Like Being in Love
|-
|2 Smoke Dreams
|-
|3 I'm So Right Tonight
|-
|4 Love and the Weather
|-
|5 Feudin' and a Fightin|-
|6 When You Got a Man on Your Mind
|-
|7 The Stanley Steamer
|-
|8 Serenade of the Bells
|-
|9 The Gentleman Is a Dope
|-
|10 Sugar
|-
|11 Autumn in New York
|-
|12 He's Gone Away
|-
|13 The Best Things in Life Are Free
|-
|14 I Never Loved Anyone
|-
|15 Once and for Always
|-
|16 Roses of Picardy
|-
|17 Just One of Those Things
|-
|18 Through the Years
|-
|19 In the Still of the Night
|-
|20 Haunted Heart
|-
|21 Smoke Gets in Your Eyes
|-
|22 Better Luck Next Time
|-
|23 This Is the Moment
|-
|24 Congratulations
|-
|25 Make Believe
|}

'A' You're AdorableA' You're Adorable is a 2001 compilation album of songs recorded by American singer Jo Stafford. It was released by the X5 Music Group on January 1, 2001.

International Hits

International Hits is a 2001 compilation album of songs recorded by American singer Jo Stafford. It was released on January 1, 2001, by Corinthian Records, the company founded by Stafford and her husband Paul Weston.

Cocktail Hour

Cocktail Hour is a 2001 compilation album of songs recorded by American singer Jo Stafford. It was released on January 9, 2001 by the Columbia River Entertainment Group.

The Magic of Jo Stafford

The Magic of Jo Stafford is a 2001 compilation album of songs recorded by American singer Jo Stafford. It was released on March 13, 2001 on the EMI Gold label. In the United Kingdom this album was released by Music for Pleasure.

Jo Stafford on Capitol

Jo Stafford on Capitol is a 2001 compilation album of songs recorded by American singer Jo Stafford. It was released on the Collectors' Choice label on June 12, 2001.

Old Rugged Cross

Old Rugged Cross is a 2001 compilation album of inspirational songs recorded by American singer Jo Stafford and singer and actor Gordon Macrae. Originally released by EMI Records on July 9, 2001, it was re-released in 2011.

Best of the War Years

Best of the War Years is a 2001 compilation album of songs recorded by American singer Jo Stafford. It was released by Stardust Records on July 10, 2001, and features tracks she recorded during the Second World War.

Platinum Collection

Platinum Collection is a 2001 compilation album of songs recorded by American singer Jo Stafford. It was released on the Start label on July 2, 2001.

The Two of Us

The Two of Us is a 2001 compilation album of songs recorded by American singer Jo Stafford and actor and singer Gordon Macrae. It was released by the Empress Recording Company on September 18, 2001.

Yes Indeed!

Yes Indeed is a 2002 compilation album box set of four discs featuring songs recorded by American singer Jo Stafford. It was released in the United Kingdom by Proper Records on April 8, 2002.
{| class="wikitable collapsible collapsed" style="width:300px;"
|-
!Track listing
|-
| Disc One - For You 
|-
|1 What Can I Say After I Say I'm Sorry
|-
|2 Little Man With a Candy Cigar
|-
|3 For You
|-
|4 Yes Indeed!
|-
|5 Swingin' on Nothin|-
|6 Let's Just Pretend
|-
|7 Who Can I Turn to?
|-
|8 It Isn't a Dream Any More
|-
|9 Embraceable You
|-
|10 Blues in the Night
|-
|11 The Night We Called It a Day
|-
|12 Manhattan Serenade
|-
|13 You Can Depend on Me
|-
|14 Old Acquaintance
|-
|15 How Sweet You Are
|-
|16 Too Marvellous For Words
|-
|17 I Remember You
|-
|18 It Could Happen to You
|-
|19 Long Ago and Far Away
|-
|20 I Love You
|-
|21 The Trolley Song
|-
|22 Amor, Amor
|-
|23 The Day After Forever
|-
|24 I Didn't Know About You
|-
| Disc Two - Candy |-
|1 Tumbling Tumbleweeds
|-
|2 Conversation While Dancing
|-
|3 On the Sunny Side of the Street
|-
|4 Let's Take the Long Way Home
|-
|5 I'll Be Seeing You
|-
|6 Candy
|-
|7 There's No You
|-
|8 That's For Me
|-
|9 Symphony
|-
|10 Day by Day
|-
|11 The Boy Next Door
|-
|12 Over the Rainbow
|-
|13 Walkin' My Baby Back Home
|-
|14 Sometimes I'm Happy
|-
|15 Baby, Won't You Please Come Home
|-
|16 Ridin' on the Gravy Train
|-
|17 I'll Be With You In Apple Blossom Time
|-
|18 This Is Always
|-
|19 I've Never Forgotten
|-
|20 You Keep Coming Back Like a Song
|-
|21 The Things We Did Last Summer
|-
|22 Fools Rush In
|-
|23 A Sunday Link of Love
|-
|24 Ivy
|-
|25 Temptation, (Tim-Tau Shun)
|-
| Disc Three - Haunted Heart |-
|1 Almost Like Being in Love
|-
|2 Smoke Dreams
|-
|3 I'm So Right Tonight
|-
|4 Love and the Weather
|-
|5 Feudin' and Fightin|-
|6 When You Got a Man on Your Mind
|-
|7 The Stanley Steamer
|-
|8 Serenade of the Bells
|-
|9 The Gentleman Is a Dope
|-
|10 Sugar (That Sugar Baby O'Mine)
|-
|11 Autumn in New York
|-
|12 He's Gone Away
|-
|13 The Best Things in Life Are Free
|-
|14 I Never Loved Anyone
|-
|15 Once and For Always
|-
|16 Roses of Picardy
|-
|17 Just One of Those Things
|-
|18 Through the Years
|-
|19 In the Still of the Night
|-
|20 Haunted Heart
|-
|21 Smoke Gets in Your Eyes
|-
|22 Better Luck Next Time
|-
|23 This Is the Moment
|-
|24 Congratulations
|-
|25 Make Believe
|-
| Disc Four - 'A' You're Adorable |-
|1 If I Loved You
|-
|2 Suspicion
|-
|3 Clabberin' up For Rain
|-
|4 Trouble in Mind
|-
|5 By the Way
|-
|6 My Darling, My Darling
|-
|7 Just Reminiscin|-
|8 On the Alamo
|-
|9 Always True to You in My Fashion
|-
|10 'A' You're Adorable
|-
|11 Why Can't You Behave?
|-
|12 Some Enchanted Evening
|-
|13 Whispering Hope
|-
|14 The Last Mile Home
|-
|15 Ragtime Cowboy Joe
|-
|16 If I Ever Love Again
|-
|17 Red River Valley
|-
|18 Scarlet Ribbons
|-
|19 It's Great to Be Alive
|-
|20 Diamonds Are a Girl's Best Friend
|-
|21 When April Comes Again
|-
|22 Simple Melody, (Play A)
|-
|23 No Other Love
|-
|24 Autumn Leaves
|-
|25 La Vie En Rose
|}

I Remember YouI Remember You is a 2002 compilation album of songs recorded by American singer Jo Stafford. It was released on the Fabulous label on July 23, 2002.

The UltimateThe Ultimate is a 2002 compilation album of songs recorded by American singer Jo Stafford. It was released by EMI Music Distribution on August 27, 2002.

The Best of Jo StaffordThe Best of Jo Stafford is a 2003 compilation album of songs recorded by American singer Jo Stafford. The album was released by CEMA Special Markets on April 1, 2003. An album of the same name with the same tracks was also released on the Collectables label on the same date as the CEMA Special Markets edition.

In 2008 the album was re-released as part of a three CD set along with the titles Getting Sentimental over Tommy Dorsey and Jo Stafford and Friends.
{| class="wikitable collapsible collapsed" style="width:300px;"
|-
!Track listing
|-
|1 The Trolley Song
|-
|2 Some Enchanted Evening
|-
|3 My Darling, My Darling
|-
|4 Scarlet Ribbons (For Her Hair)
|-
|5 Serenade of the Bells
|-
|6 "A" You're Adorable (The Alphabet Song)
|-
|7 The Things We Did Last Summer
|-
|8 Candy
|-
|9 That's for Me
|-
|10 Feudin' and a Fightin|}

Meet Jo StaffordMeet Jo Stafford is a 2003 compilation album of songs recorded by American singer Jo Stafford. It was released by Sepia Records on April 29, 2003.

The Columbia Singles Collection, Vol. 1 

The Columbia Singles Collection, Vol. 1 is a compilation album of songs recorded by American singer Jo Stafford during her time at Columbia Records. This album was released by Corinthian Records, the company founded by Stafford and her husband, Paul Weston, on February 17, 2004.

You Belong to Me

You Belong to Me is a 2004 compilation album of songs recorded by American singer Jo Stafford. It is one of many Stafford compilations to have been released in the early 2000s under the title You Belong to Me, the name derived from the song of the same name, which became one of her best known hits during the 1950s. This album was released on June 29, 2004 and appears on the Memoir label.

You Belong to Me

You Belong to Me is a 2004 compilation album of songs recorded by American singer Jo Stafford. It is one of many Stafford compilations to have been released in the early 2000s under the title You Belong to Me, the name derived from the song of the same name which became one of her best known hits during the 1950s. This album was released on June 29, 2004 by Remember Records.

You Belong to Me

You Belong to Me is a 2004 compilation album of songs recorded by American singer Jo Stafford. It is one of many Stafford compilations to have been released in the early 2000s under the title You Belong to Me, the name derived from the song of the same name which became one of her best known hits during the 1950s. This album was released on June 29, 2004 by Rajon Entertainment Pty Ltd.

You Belong to Me

You Belong to Me is a 2004 compilation album of songs recorded by American singer Jo Stafford. It is one of many Stafford compilations to have been released in the early 2000s under the title You Belong to Me, the name derived from the song of the same name which became one of her best known hits during the 1950s. This album was released on June 29, 2004 and appears on the ASV and Living Era labels.

Stars of the Summer Night

Stars of the Summer Night is a 2004 compilation album of songs recorded by American singer Jo Stafford and actor/singer Gordon Macrae. It was released on the Sepia label on July 13, 2004.

Over the Rainbow

Over the Rainbow is a 2004 compilation album of songs recorded by American singer Jo Stafford. The album was released on the BCI label on September 7, 2004.

Alone & Together

Alone & Together is a 2005 compilation album of songs recorded by American singer Jo Stafford and actor/singer Gordon Macrae. The album features both duets by Stafford and Macrae, as well as solo performances by both artists. It was released on February 28, 2005 on the Castle Pulse label.

Memories Are Made of These

Memories Are Made of These is a 2005 compilation album of songs recorded by American artist Jo Stafford. The album was released on August 2, 2005, and has appeared on the Essential Gold and Dynamic labels.
{| class="wikitable collapsible collapsed" style="width:300px;"
|-
!Track listing
|-
|1 Dear Hearts and Gentle People
|-
|2 You'd Be So Nice to Come Home To
|-
|3 Shoo-Fly Pie and Apple Pan Dowdy
|-
|4 I Hear a Rhapsody
|-
|5 Dearly Beloved
|-
|6 Lavender Blue (Dilly Dilly)
|-
|7 Far Away Places
|-
|8 Sweet Violets
|-
|9 I Don't Want to Walk Without You
|-
|10 Sleepy Lagoon
|-
|11 I'll Walk Alone
|-
|12 Blues in the Night
|-
|13 They Didn't Believe Me
|-
|14 My Heart Cries for You
|-
|15 The Nearness of You
|-
|16 Skylark
|-
|17 Together
|-
|18 Baby, It's Cold Outside
|-
|19 I Wish I Didn't Love You So
|-
|20 You Keep Coming Back Like a Song
|-
|21 Doin' What Comes Natur'lly
|-
|22 The Gypsy
|-
|23 (I Love You) For Sentimental Reasons
|-
|24 Buttons and Bows
|-
|25 Smoke Gets in Your Eyes
|-
|26 You Belong to Me
|-
|27 Jambalaya (On the Bayou)
|-
|28 Make Love to Me
|-
|29 Shrimp Boats
|-
|30 Teach Me Tonight
|-
|31 Candy
|-
|32 Feudin' and Fightin|-
|33 Some Enchanted Evening
|-
|34 No Other Love
|-
|35 Day by Day
|-
|36 Keep It a Secret
|-
|37 My Darling, My Darling
|-
|38 A-Round the Corner
|-
|39 It Is No Secret (What God Can Do)
|-
|40 Gambella
|-
|41 It Could Happen to You
|-
|42 That's for Me
|-
|43 Hambone
|-
|44 Hey, Good Lookin'
|-
|45 Symphony
|-
|46 In the Cool, Cool, Cool of the Evening
|-
|47 Early Autumn
|-
|48 Somebody
|-
|49 Serenade of the Bells
|-
|50 (Now and Then There's) A Fool Such as I
|-
|51 Hey There
|-
|52 Half as Much
|-
|53 This Ole House
|-
|54 Come On-A My House
|-
|55 Two Old to Cut the Mustard
|-
|56 Hello, Young Lovers
|-
|57 Who Kissed Me Last Night?
|-
|58 Tenderly
|-
|59 Botch-A-Me (Ba-Ba Baciami Piccina)
|-
|60 Count Your Blessings (Instead of Sheep)
|-
|61 Young at Heart
|-
|62 You're Just in Love
|-
|63 If Teardrops Were Pennies
|-
|64 It Might as Well Be Spring
|-
|65 Marrying for Love
|-
|66 Mambo Italiano
|-
|67 Mixed Emotions
|-
|68 You Make Me Feel So Young
|-
|69 When You Love Someone
|-
|70 Beautiful Brown Eyes
|-
|71 Be My Life's Companion
|-
|72 Over the Rainbow
|-
|73 You'll Never Know
|-
|74 Younger Than Springtime
|-
|75 When You Wish Upon a Star
|}

Love, Mystery and AdventureLove, Mystery and Adventure is a 2006 compilation album of songs recorded by American artist Jo Stafford. It was released by Jasmine Records on April 18, 2006.

Sincerely YoursSincerely Yours is a 2006 compilation album of songs recorded by American singer Jo Stafford. It was released on May 9, 2006 on the Sepia label.

The "Hollywood House Party" included on the album was a special release of Columbia Records in 1955. It was recorded at a party Stafford and husband Paul Weston gave at their home. Columbia had produced several new phonographs in 1955; part of their sales promotion for them was to give buyers of units valued at $100 or more the Columbia House Party album, which was not available any other way.  One side of the album featured the party with celebrities at the Weston's California home, while the other featured Mitch Miller's New York City party. Those who attended the Weston's Hollywood house party and are heard on this album include Liberace, Dave Brubeck, and Frankie Laine.

Vintage YearsVintage Years is a 2006 compilation album of songs recorded by American singer Jo Stafford. The album was released under the Red X label on June 22, 2006.

All Hits!All Hits! is a 2006 compilation album of songs recorded by Jo Stafford. The album was released on the Golden Stars label on 18 December 2006.
{| class="wikitable collapsible collapsed" style="width:300px;"
|-
!Track listing
|-
|1 Yes, Indeed!
|-
|2 I Love You
|-
|3 Long Ago (and Far Away)
|-
|4 It Could Happen To You
|-
|5 On the Sunny Side of the Street
|-
|6 Candy
|-
|7 There's No You
|-
|8 That's For Me
|-
|9 You Keep Coming Back Like a Song
|-
|10 Symphony
|-
|11 Day by Day
|-
|12 Temptation (Tim-Tayshun)
|-
|13 A Sunday Kind Of Love
|-
|14 Serenade of the Bells
|-
|15 Feudin' and Fightin|-
|16 The Gentleman Is A Dope
|-
|17 Haunted Heart
|-
|18 My Darling, My Darling
|-
|19 Congratulations
|-
|20 Once and For Always
|-
|21 "A" - You're Adorable
|-
|22 Some Enchanted Evening
|-
|23 Ragtime Cowboy Joe
|-
|24 Whispering Hope
|-
|25 No Other Love
|-
|26 If You've Got The Money, I've Got The Time
|-
|27 Scarlet Ribbons (For Her Hair)
|-
|28 Shrimp Boats
|-
|29 If
|-
|30 Tennessee Waltz
|-
|31 It Is No Secret (What God Can Do)
|-
|32 In the Cool, Cool, Cool of the Evening
|-
|33 Hey Good Lookin'
|-
|34 Somebody
|-
|35 Pretty Eyed Baby
|-
|36 You Belong to Me
|-
|37 Jambalaya
|-
|38 Ay-Round The Corner
|-
|39 Early Autumn
|-
|40 Hambone
|-
|41 (Tonight We're) Setting The Woods On Fire
|-
|42 Keep It a Secret
|-
|43 (Now And Then There's) A Fool Such As I
|-
|44 Make Love to Me
|-
|45 Thank You For Calling
|-
|46 Teach Me Tonight
|-
|47 Suddenly There's You
|-
|48 It's Almost Tomorrow
|}

Ultimate Capitol CollectionUltimate Capitol Collection is a 2007 compilation album of songs recorded by American singer Jo Stafford. The album was released on the EMI label on June 4, 2007.
{| class="wikitable collapsible collapsed" style="width:300px;"
|-
!Track listing
|-
|1 Old Acquaintance
|-
|2 Pistol Packin' Mama
|-
|3 I Didn't Know About You
|-
|4 Candy
|-
|5 My Darling, My Darling
|-
|6 Tim-Tay-Shun (Temptation)
|-
|7 Whispering Hope
|-
|8 Winter Wonderland
|-
|9 Almost Like Being in Love
|-
|10 Autumn Leaves
|-
|11 Suspicion
|-
|12 The Traveling Salesman Polka
|-
|13 Red River Valley
|-
|14 The Old Rugged Cross
|-
|15 These Will Be the Best Years of Our Lives
|-
|16 Love and the Weather
|-
|17 Love's Old Sweet Song
|-
|18 No Other Love
|-
|19 Haunted Heart
|-
|20 Alone Together
|-
|21 I'll Be Seeing You
|-
|22 I Wonder as I Wander
|-
|23 Poor Wayfaring Stranger
|-
|24 Scarlet Ribbons (For Her Hair)
|-
|25 Georgia on My Mind
|-
|26 The Boy Next Door
|-
|27 Make Believe
|-
|28 Carry Me Back to Old Virginny
|-
|29 Hold Me, Hold Me
|-
|30 It's Monday Every Day
|-
|31 Near Me
|-
|32 Sweet By and By
|-
|33 This Time
|-
|34 Oh, Holy Morning
|-
|35 A Perfect Day
|-
|36 Diamonds Are a Girl's Best Friend
|-
|37 Day by Day
|-
|38 Echoes
|-
|39 Feudin' and Fightin|-
|40 If I Loved You
|-
|41 In the Still of the Night
|-
|42 Nearer, My God, to Thee
|-
|43 Long Ago (and Far Away)
|-
|44 When It's Springtime in the Rockies
|-
|45 Roses of Picardy
|-
|46 Walkin' My Baby Back Home
|-
|47 Some Enchanted Evening
|-
|48 Adios My Love
|-
|49 If My Heart Had a Window
|-
|50 The Last Time I Saw You
|-
|51 Rockin' Chair
|-
|52 You Wear Love So Well
|-
|53 When Day Is Done
|}

Blues in the NightBlues in the Night is a 2007 compilation album of songs recorded by American singer Jo Stafford. This collection, released on the PIO label in the United Kingdom, has 23 tracks. It was released on October 30, 2007.

Her Greatest HitsHer Greatest Hits is a 2008 compilation album of songs recorded by American artist Jo Stafford. This album, released by JSP on January 8, 2008, features over 100 of Stafford's recordings.

You Belong to MeYou Belong to Me is a 2008 compilation album of songs by American artist Jo Stafford. Released on the Dynamic label on April 8, 2008, the album features 16 of Stafford's hits.

The Capitol Rarities 1943-1950The Capitol Rarities 1943-1950 is a 2009 compilation album of songs recorded by American singer Jo Stafford. It was released on March 24, 2009 on the DRG label and is a collection of rare recordings from the earlier part of her career.

Reflections: The Ultimate CollectionReflections: The Ultimate Collection''''' is a 2009 compilation of recordings by Jo Stafford. The collection was released on the Jasmine label on July 14, 2009 as a 4-CD set.

References 

 2000-2009
Stafford Compilations 2000-2009
2000s compilation albums
Stafford 2000